The 1956 European Figure Skating Championships were held on January 19–21, 1956 in Paris, France. Elite senior-level figure skaters from European ISU member nations competed for the title of European Champion in the disciplines of men's singles, ladies' singles, pair skating, and ice dancing.

Results

Men

Ladies

Pairs

Ice dancing

References

External links
 results

European Figure Skating Championships
European Figure Skating Championships
1956
European Championships 1956
European Figure Skating Championships
European Figure Skating Championships 1956
European Figure Skating Championships